Mushegh Sarvarian (also known as Mushegh Sarvari, February 15, 1910, Tehran - August 13, 1981, Tehran) was an Iranian Armenian film director.

He directed a number of films, among which is the 1956 film A Party in Hell, a co-direction with Samuel Khachikian and a notable movie in the history of Iranian cinema. It was entered into the 8th Berlin International Film Festival.

Filmography 
Mahtabe Khoonin (The Bloody Moonlight) (1956)
Shab-Neshini dar Jahannam (A Party in Hell) (1956)
Haji Jabbar dar Paris (Mr. Jabbar in Paris) (1961)
Shahname Akharesh Khoshe (1966)

References

External links

Iranian film directors
Iranian people of Armenian descent
People from Tehran
1910 births
1981 deaths